"Ain't Gonna Bump No More (With No Big Fat Woman)" was a composition by Joe Tex and Buddy Killen, and released by Tex as a single in 1977, bringing the musician back to the top 40 of the US pop and R&B charts simultaneously for the first time since 1972's "I Gotcha". Tex used his aunt Bennie Lee McGinty's name as composer for tax reasons.

Reception
Tex's previous hit, "Have You Ever", was a hit in New Zealand. In the US, "Ain't Gonna Bump No More" was received well upon its release in 1977, reaching number 12 on the Billboard Hot 100 and number 7 on the Billboard R&B chart. Overseas, it was also a success in Europe, reaching number 2 in the UK Singles Chart and number 3 in Ireland.

Tex was later nominated for a Grammy Award for the song and performed the song at the ceremony in 1978. The song was released from the album, Bumps and Bruises. It would be Tex's final hit before his death in 1982.

Charts

Weekly charts

Year-end charts

Personnel
Credits taken from the liner notes of the LP Bumps and Bruises

 Joe Tex: singer, composer
 Buddy Killen: producer
 Ernie Winfrey: recording engineer
 Lea Jane Berinati, Janie Fricke, Yvonne Hodges, Ginger Holladay: background vocals

References

1977 songs
1977 singles
Joe Tex songs
Songs written by Buddy Killen
Song recordings produced by Buddy Killen
Songs written by Joe Tex